Alfredo Horacio Stephens Francis (born 25 December 1994) is a Panamanian professional footballer who plays as an attacking midfielder for Ecuadorian Serie A club 9 de Octubre and the Panama national football team.

Club career
In summer 2014, Stephens joined Chorrillo from Plaza Amador. In July 2015, he moved abroad to play for Slovakian side DAC Dunajská Streda.

International career
Stephens played at the 2011 U-17 World Cup in Mexico.

Stephens made his senior debut for Panama in an unofficial May 2012 friendly match against Guyana, his first official match being an August 2014 friendly against Peru. As of 15 August 2015, he has earned a total of six caps, scoring no goals. He represented his country at the 2015 CONCACAF Gold Cup.

International goals
Scores and results list Panama's goal tally first.

References

External links
 
 

1994 births
Living people
Association football midfielders
Panamanian footballers
Panama international footballers
2014 Copa Centroamericana players
2015 CONCACAF Gold Cup players
Primeira Liga players
C.D. Plaza Amador players
Unión Deportivo Universitario players
FC DAC 1904 Dunajská Streda players
C.D. Santa Clara players
Panamanian expatriate footballers
Expatriate footballers in Slovakia
Expatriate footballers in Portugal